The Oignies and Courrières massacre was a mass killing of 124  French civilians perpetrated by German forces in the mining village of Oignies and nearby town of Courrières, both in Nord-Pas de Calais, on 28 May 1940 amid the Battle of France. The unit responsible for the atrocity was the 487th Infantry Regiment of the 267th Infantry Division. Altogether, it is thought a total of 500 French civilians were murdered by German forces in Nord-Pas de Calas in May 1940.

Elements of the British Expeditionary Force and French colonial forces had resisted the German advance at Oignies with some success but were overcome during the night of 27 to 28 May 1940. The historian Fabrice Virgili writes that "as soon as the German soldiers surrounded the area, executions, pillaging, and destruction followed. Eighty inhabitants, including ten women, were killed, shot for the most part, 
and the village was practically destroyed." A number of women were raped. Altogether, 400 buildings were burnt at Oignies.

At nearby Courrières, 46 civilian hostages were summarily executed by German forces. 22 of these were inhabitants of the town, while the remainder were refugees caught up in the Exodus. A large number of buildings were also destroyed including the Church.

The victims in Oignies are commemorated by a mausoleum and a major road was renamed rue des 80 fusiliés.

See also
Vinkt massacre - massacre of Belgian civilians (26-28 May 1940)
Le Paradis massacre - massacre of British prisoners of war (27 May 1940)
Wormhoudt massacre - massacre of British and French prisoners of war (28 May 1940)

References

Mass murder in 1940
History of Hauts-de-France
German occupation of France during World War II
War crimes of the Wehrmacht
World War II massacres
Massacres committed by Nazi Germany
May 1940 events
1940 in France
Battle of France
Massacres in France